This is a list of events in British radio during 1975.

Events

January
1 January – BBC Radio Ulster launches as a full time station. It replaces what had been a Northern Ireland opt-out of BBC Radio 4.
6 January – BBC Radio 2's broadcasting hours are reduced due to budget cuts at the BBC. The former 5am2am schedule is reduced to a 6am start up Mondays to Saturdays with a 6:55am start up on Sundays. The station closes down at around 12:33am each day. Another consequence on the cuts is that David Hamilton's afternoon show is broadcast on both Radio 1 and Radio 2.
 22 January – Radio Forth begins broadcasting to the Edinburgh area.

February
No events.

March
No events.

April
No events.

May
 19 May – Plymouth Sound begins broadcasting to the Plymouth area.

June
 9 June – Proceedings in the Parliament of the United Kingdom are broadcast on radio for the first time.
 24 June – Radio Tees begins broadcasting to the Teesside area.

July
 3 July – Radio Trent beings broadcasting to the Nottingham area.

August
No events.

September
 16 September – Pennine Radio begins broadcasting to the Bradford area.
 29 September – BBC Radio 2's broadcasting hours are further reduced when the station closes slightly earlier, concluding its day at around 12:10am Mondays to Fridays, and at 12:33am on Saturdays and Sundays.
September – The first edition of The Sunday Request Show is broadcast on BBC Radio 1. Presented by Annie Nightingale, the show runs until the end of 1979 before being re-introduced as an evening programme in 1982.

October
 14 October – Radio Victory begins broadcasting to the Portsmouth area.
 28 October – Radio Orwell begins broadcasting to the Ipswich area.

November
No events.

December
No events.

Station debuts
1 January – BBC Radio Ulster
22 January – Radio Forth
19 May – Plymouth Sound
24 June – Radio Tees
3 July – Radio Trent
16 September – Pennine Radio
14 October – Radio Victory
28 October – Radio Orwell

Programme debuts
 1 October – The News Huddlines on BBC Radio 2 (1975–2001)

Continuing radio programmes

1940s
 Sunday Half Hour (1940–2018)
 Desert Island Discs (1942–Present)
 Down Your Way (1946–1992)
 Letter from America (1946–2004)
 Woman's Hour (1946–Present)
 A Book at Bedtime (1949–Present)

1950s
 The Archers (1950–Present)
 The Today Programme (1957–Present)
 The Navy Lark (1959–1977)
 Sing Something Simple (1959–2001)
 Your Hundred Best Tunes (1959–2007)

1960s
 Farming Today (1960–Present)
 In Touch (1961–Present)
 The Men from the Ministry (1962–1977)
 Petticoat Line (1965–1979)
 The World at One (1965–Present)
 The Official Chart (1967–Present)
 Just a Minute (1967–Present)
 The Living World (1968–Present)
 The Organist Entertains (1969–2018)

1970s
 PM (1970–Present)
 Start the Week (1970–Present)
 Week Ending (1970–1998)
 You and Yours (1970–Present)
 I'm Sorry I Haven't a Clue (1972–Present)
 Good Morning Scotland (1973–Present)
 Hello Cheeky (1973–1979)
 Kaleidoscope (1973–1998)
 Newsbeat (1973–Present)

Births
 January – Adam Rutherford, geneticist and science broadcaster
 31 March – Jonny Saunders, radio sports reporter, presenter and commentator
 1 April – Suzy Klein, arts broadcast presenter
 25 July – Margaret Cabourn-Smith, comedy actress
 31 July – Stephanie Hirst, radio presenter
 23 September – Chris Hawkins, radio presenter
 20 November – Jason Mohammad, radio and television presenter
 30 November – Richard Bacon, broadcast presenter
 15 December – Ayesha Hazarika, Scottish broadcast journalist, political adviser and comedian
 Ros Atkins, broadcast journalist
 Catherine Shepherd, comedy actress

Deaths
 3 March – Sandy MacPherson, theatre organist (born 1897)
 3 April – Jacques Brown, radio comedy producer (born 1900)
 10 November – William Hardcastle, radio news presenter (born 1918)

See also 
 1975 in British music
 1975 in British television
 1975 in the United Kingdom
 List of British films of 1975

References

Radio
British Radio, 1975 In
Years in British radio